C-Bo's Mob Figaz is the debut studio album by American West Coast hip hop supergroup Mob Figaz. It was released on May 18, 1999 via West Coast Mafia Records/Git Paid Entertainmant. Production was handled by Kezo, Lev Berlak, One Drop Scott, DJ Daryl, RobLo, SupaFlexXx, JT the Bigga Figga and Mo Stewart, with C-Bo serving as executive producer. It features guest appearances from C-Bo, Huccabucc, Young Kyoz, Spice 1, B.A., LaToya London, Marvaless, N4SA, Steady Mobb'n, Unda P, Young Meek and Yukmouth. It peaked at number 63 on the Top R&B/Hip-Hop Albums chart in the US.

Track listing

Personnel 
 AP.9 – main artist
 Fed-X – main artist
 Bob "Husalah" James – main artist
 Rydah J. Klyde – main artist
 Dominick "The Jacka" Newton – main artist
 Shawn "C-Bo" Thomas – featured artist (tracks: 1, 4, 8, 9, 13, 15), executive producer
 LaToya London – featured artist (track 3)
 Huc-A-Buc – featured artist (tracks: 4, 9)
 Kevin "Kaos" Crockett – featured artist (tracks: 4, 14)
 Aaron "Crooked Eye" Edmand – featured artist (track 5)
 Billy "Bavgate" Moore – featured artist (track 5)
 N4SA – featured artist (track 6)
 Unda P – featured artist (track 6)
 Young Meek – featured artist (track 9)
 Marva "Marvaless" Cooks – featured artist (track 9)
 Lamore "B.A." Jacks – featured artist (track 10)
 Jerold "Yukmouth" Ellis III – featured artist (track 10)
 Robert "Spice 1" Green, Jr. – featured artist (tracks: 14, 15)
 Jason "J-Dino" Moss – guitar (track 1), co-producer (track 3), mixing
 Lev Berlak – producer (tracks: 1, 2, 7), co-producer (track 3), mixing
 Wilson "Flexx" Hankins – producer (tracks: 1, 7)
 R. "Roblow" Mixon – producer (tracks: 2, 3)
 Kezo – producer (tracks: 4, 12, 14, 15)
 Daryl Anderson – producer (tracks: 5, 13), mixing (track 13)
 Scott "1 Drop Scott" Roberts – producer (tracks: 6, 10, 11)
 Maurice "Mo-Z" Stewart – producer (track 8)
 Joseph "JT the Bigga Figga" Tom – producer (track 9)
 Ken Lee – mastering
 Ghostribe Graphix – layout, design

Charts

References

External links

1999 albums
Mob Figaz albums